Hickory Withe Presbyterian Church is a member congregation of the Presbyterian Church in America, located at 2420 Donelson Drive, Hickory Withe, Tennessee. Two churches, Prosperity Presbyterian Church and Mount Pleasant Presbyterian Church, merged in 1907 to form Hickory Withe Presbyterian Church.

History 
Prosperity Presbyterian Church was located near Oakland, Tennessee (between Oakland and Arlington, Tennessee) in western Fayette County, Tennessee. It was named Prosperity because many of the charter members came from Prosperity, South Carolina. Prosperity was organized on the fourth Sunday in December, 1834 by 29 congregants. Later the congregation moved to the southeast corner of the intersection of State Route 196 and Donelson Drive. The Prosperity Church soon became a member congregation of the Presbyterian Church in the United States.

Also in 1834, a Cumberland Presbyterian Church was established in the Hickory Withe community called Mount Pleasant Church. This church was originally located on Ivy Road at the site of the Mount Pleasant Cemetery. The name was later changed to the Hickory Withe Cumberland Presbyterian Church, and it moved to the location on Donelson Drive, where the present day Hickory Withe Presbyterian Church is located.

On May 10, 1907, the congregation of Hickory Withe Cumberland Presbyterian Church at Hickory Withe voted to dissolve and the membership was received into Prosperity Presbyterian Church. The Cumberland congregation had the larger church building and the Prosperity Presbyterian Church had a pastor, so the congregations united. The name of the church was changed to Hickory Withe Presbyterian Church.

For more than 50 years, the Hickory Withe Church shared a minister with the Oakland Presbyterian Church, and would have Sunday School each Sunday but would have worship services only twice a month.

In 1980 with the recommendation of the session and 100% vote of the congregation, the church withdrew from the Presbyterian Church in the United States and joined the Presbyterian Church in America.

Historic buildings 
The sanctuary of the Hickory Withe Presbyterian Church is a simple Carpenter Gothic structure in the Gablefront house style. It was erected in the 1850s, and today's structure remains faithful to the original architecture. Changes to the original sanctuary include: closing off the original "slave gallery," which was provided during the early American era when slave-owners were expected to bring their slaves to church in order that they may be converted; replacement installation of stained-glass windows; installation of a raked sub-floor; and replacement of the shingled roof with a metal roof. Nearing condemned status in the 1980s, the sanctuary foundation was fully repaired and the building returned to sound condition.

There was a school located on the west side of the church, and in the 1930s it was determined that there was a need for the old school to be torn down and a new school built by the Works Progress Administration. Will Weber, a Ruling Elder of Hickory Withe Presbyterian Church and chairman of the School Board, is reported to have prayed alone all night asking God's will on where the school should be built. The next morning he announced that the front of the school should be at the edge of the church property. In 1974, Ruling Elders Alfred Hodges (at that time a county commissioner) and Mayes Webb (a member of the school board) helped in an effort for the church to buy the school building for use as the church's fellowship hall.

Also in the 1980s, an education wing was added onto the sanctuary building, adding multiple classrooms, nursery facilities, bathrooms, utility/storage space, and a Pastor's Study. Wheelchair access was also added with the new wing.

Location 
Hickory Withe Presbyterian Church is located at 2420 Donelson Drive in Hickory Withe, Tennessee, in Fayette County, Tennessee.

List of pastors 
Douglas (Doug) Barcroft (February 21, 2010–present)
J.E. Eubanks, Jr. (October 8, 2007 – October 16, 2011)
James E. (Jim) Hayes (1997–February 26, 2007)
Cecil Wells (1996–April 27, 1997)
Kenneth Lee (Ken) Camp (November, 1981–October 15, 1996)
Charles Robert Coe, Jr. (October, 1980–October, 1981)
Charles E. (Chuck) Swann (September, 1975–December, 1978)
Ben W. Baker (April, 1972–August, 1975)
C.V. Crabb (February, 1967–February, 1972)
Dr. Samuel Edgar McFadden (October, 1961–November, 1966)
Robert Hyatt (April, 1959–July, 1960)
Algernon Killough (June, 1954–June, 1958)
George H. Totton (July, 1952–October, 1953)
Charles H. Hamilton (June, 1939–June, 1941)
Dr, Walter S. Swetnam (April, 1931–July, 1935)
P.P. Dawson (January, 1927–September, 1928)
Haller Shelton Henderson (February, 1921–March, 1926)
O.W. Wardlaw (November 28, 1915 – September 12, 1920)
J.D. Hemming (April 30, 1911–September, 1913)
G.H. Kirken (July 13, 1906 – January 10, 1910)
S.S. (Sid) Gill (January 27, 1861 – April 9, 1905)
J.H. Waddell (September 8, 1860—served as Moderator at that time)
Robert McCoy (April, 1858–January, 1860)
A.D. Metcalf (February 26, 1854 – April 8, 1858)
Louis McNeely (February 26, 1854 – April 8, 1858)
Robert McCoy (May 20, 1848 – January 22, 1854)
T.L. Newbury (September 6, 1846–December, 1846)
M.T. Alien (October 2, 1841 – April 7, 1846)
Peter R. Bland (November 1, 1840 – April 4, 1841)
Henry W. Kerr (February 21, 1836 – April 4, 1840)
Peter Randolph Bland (December 1834–August 31, 1835)

External links
 Hickory Withe Presbyterian Church website
 A Brief History of the Hickory Withe Presbyterian Church
 Presbyterian Church in America website

Presbyterian Church in America churches in Tennessee
Buildings and structures in Fayette County, Tennessee
Carpenter Gothic church buildings in Tennessee
19th-century Presbyterian church buildings in the United States
Works Progress Administration in Tennessee